Helge Kvamme (1938 – 5 August 1996) is a Norwegian jurist and businessperson.

He was born in Bergen. He was a jurist by education and worked as a lecturer at the University of Oslo from 1969 to 1973. He was hired in Norges Brannkasse in 1974, and in 1977 he was promoted to deputy chief executive. In 1984 the company entered the insurance group UNI Forsikring. He left the company in 1986 to work as a director in Gjensidige. He was also chair of Statoil from 1992.

He held both the director and chairman post until he died in 1996, on a business trip in Finland with Gjensidige. An obituary was published by later Prime Minister Jens Stoltenberg, who praised Kvamme's work in Statoil.

References

1938 births
1996 deaths
Businesspeople from Bergen
Academic staff of the University of Oslo
Norwegian jurists
Norwegian businesspeople in insurance
Norwegian businesspeople in the oil industry
Gjensidige people
Equinor people